What Would Sophia Loren Do? is an 2021 American documentary short film, directed by Ross Kauffman. It follows Nancy Kulik, who finds her joy in the life of her idol Sophia Loren, and was released on Netflix on January 15, 2021.

Plot
Nancy Kulik, a mother and grandmother, finds her strength and joy through the work of her idol, actress Sophia Loren. Loren, Edoardo Ponti, and Regina K. Scully also appear in the film.

Production
Regina K. Scully wanted to make a film about her mother's love of Sophia Loren, her family and after discussing the idea with Ross Kauffman who agreed to direct the project. The film had begun production prior to Scully serving as a producer on The Life Ahead (which also starred Loren), which granted her the opportunity to arrange a meeting between her mother and Loren.

Release
The film was released on January 15, 2021, on Netflix.

References

External links
 
 

2021 films
American short documentary films
English-language Netflix original films
Italian-language Netflix original films
2021 short documentary films
Films directed by Ross Kauffman
2020s American films